Dabang Delhi KC is a Kabaddi club based in New Delhi, India that plays in the Pro Kabaddi League. The team is currently led by Naveen Kumar Goyat and coached by Krishan Kumar Hooda. The team is owned by Radha Kapoor and they play their home matches at the Thyagaraj Sports Complex, New Delhi.
The team have won their maiden VIVO Pro Kabaddi League title defeating Patna Pirates in the 2021–22 season final.

Franchise history 
Pro Kabaddi League (PKL) is a professional Kabaddi league in India, based on the format of the Indian Premier League T20 cricket tournament. The first edition of the tournament was played in 2014 with eight franchises representing various cities in India. Dabang Delhi is a Delhi based franchise owned by Radha Kapoor.

Current squad

Seasons

Season I 

Delhi finished sixth in the first season.

Season II 

Dabang Delhi finished 7th in the second season.

Season III 

Dabang Delhi finished 8th in the Third season.

Season IV

Season V 

Dabang Delhi finished 7th in the Fourth season.

Season VI

Season VII

Season VIII

Season IX

Records

Overall results Pro Kabbaddi season

By opposition 
Note: Table lists in alphabetical order.

Sponsors

References 

Pro Kabaddi League teams
Sports clubs in Delhi
2014 establishments in Delhi
Kabaddi clubs established in 2014
Sport in Bangalore